Aoupinieta is a genus of moths belonging to the subfamily Tortricinae of the family Tortricidae.

Species
Aoupinieta hollowayi Razowski, 2012
Aoupinieta mountpanieae Razowski, 2013
Aoupinieta novaecaledoniae Razowski, 2012
Aoupinieta obesa Razowski, 2013
Aoupinieta setaria Razowski, 2013
Aoupinieta silacea Razowski, 2013

Etymology
The generic name refers to Mount Aopinie, the type locality of the type-species.

See also
List of Tortricidae genera

References

 , 2013: Leaf-rollers from New Caledonia (Lepidoptera: Tortricidae). Shilap Revista de Lepidopterologia 41 (161): 69-93. Full article: .

Archipini
Tortricidae genera